Giheung Station is a subway station of the Suin–Bundang Line and EverLine, in the city of Yongin, Gyeonggi-do.

References

Seoul Metropolitan Subway stations
Railway stations opened in 2011
Metro stations in Yongin